Hilotrons is a Canadian indie pop band. Currently based in Ottawa, the band's core members are the singer Mike Dubue and the drummer and engineer Philip Shaw Bova. Past members have included Paul Hogan, Damian Sawka and Mike Schultz. The bands current line-up includes Pascal OfLaki, Philippe Charbonneau and Alex Moxon with, as well as occasionally, Adam Saikaley.

Initially an electronic dance music band, they began to incorporate a blend of pop styles into their sound. Their breakthrough album, Happymatic (2008), was a longlisted nominee for the 2008 Polaris Music Prize.

Before Dubue released At Least There's Commotion, he spent his time composing film scores including Smash Cut and many silent films with the Lost Dominion Collective. He made a number of musical collaborations including performing Richard Reed Parry's For Heart, Breath and Orchestra appearing on Socalled's Sleepover album.

The band performed its final show with its full original line-up at the Black Sheep Inn in Wakefield, Quebec, in October 2012, Dubue and Bova worked with a stable of guest musicians, including Michael Feuerstack, Jeremy Fisher and Jim Bryson, Geoffrey Pye (Yellow Jacket Avenger), to complete the band's fourth album At Least There's Commotion, which was released in 2013. Since its release, Hilotrons have played in various incarnations including a noisy duo of Dubue and Adam Sakailey with guests such as Julian Beillard (Wooden Stars) and Mike Feuerstack. At Pop Montreal 2013, Hilotrons performed on the same bill as Bernie Worrell and Fred Wesley as an 11-piece band with  members including the original line up (Hogan, Schultz, Sawka, Bova), the new line-up (Pascal OfLaki, Philippe Charbonneau and Alex Moxon) as well Michael Feuerstack, Adam Sakailey and Dan Sauve (Empiricals). The band released its fifth album, To Trip With Terpsichore, on February 24, 2015.

Discography
Hilotrons (2003)
Bella Simone (2006)
Happymatic (2008) 
At Least There's Commotion (2013)
To Trip With Terpsichore (2015)
Lonely Cinema (2020)

References

External links
Hilotrons

Canadian indie pop groups
Musical groups from Ottawa
Musical groups with year of establishment missing